Edsåsdalen is an alpine ski area in the Åre Municipality in Jämtland County, Sweden. The ski area has 10 runs and 5 lifts for downhill skiing on the southern slope of Renfjället. An outdoor shooting range is adjacent to the cross-country tracks for biathletes with a capacity of 40 persons.

European route E14 passes Undersåker a few kilometres to the north, and connects with Östersund to the east and Trondheim, Norway, to the west. In Undersåker, there are also connections by railway to Östersund and Trondheim via the Central Line. Åre Östersund Airport and Trondheim Airport, Værnes, are the closest international airports.

References 

Ski areas and resorts in Sweden
Buildings and structures in Jämtland County
Tourist attractions in Jämtland County